Habenaria chlorosepala, commonly known as the green-hooded rein orchid, is a species of orchid that is endemic to a small area in far north Queensland. It has two or three leaves at its base and up to twenty small green and white flowers.

Description 
The dorsal sepal and petals overlap at their bases and form a hood over the column. Flowering occurs between January and April.

Taxonomy and naming
Habenaria chlorosepala was first formally described in 1998 by David Jones from a specimen collected near Cooktown by Lewis Roberts in 1993 and the description was published in The Orchadian. The specific epithet (chlorosepala) is derived from the Ancient Greek word chloros meaning "green" and the New Latin word sepalum meaning "a leafy division of the calyx".

Distribution and habitat
The green-hooded rein orchid has a narrow distribution south of Cooktown where it grows with low plants in summer-wet woodland.

References

Orchids of Queensland
Endemic orchids of Australia
Plants described in 1998
chlorosepala